The Treatment is the sixth full-length album by Early Day Miners, released on September 8, 2009 on Secretly Canadian Records.

Track listing
"In the Fire" – 4:23
"So Slowly" – 6:56
"The Surface of Things" – 6:20
"Spaces" – 4:23
"How to Fall" – 5:21
"The Zip" – 5:10
"Becloud" – 8:11
"Silver Oath" – 1:59

Personnel
Dan Burton: vocals, guitar
John Dawson: guitar
Marty Sprowles: drums
Jonathan Richardson: bass

References

Early Day Miners albums
2009 albums
Secretly Canadian albums